'Hosohime no Mikoto (also spelled Kuwashihime no Mikoto and Hosohime no Mikoto), the empress of Emperor Kōrei. She is believed to be the birth mother of Emperor Kōgen.

Overview 
In the text of the Nihon Shoki (Chronicles of Japan), she is said to be the daughter of Omoku, the lord of Isogi Prefecture, while the Kojiki (Records of Ancient Matters) says she was Hosohime, the daughter of Omoku, the founder of Juichi Prefecture.

In the first book of the Nihon Shoki (Chronicles of Japan), the empress of Emperor Koryō was Kasuga no Chihayamakahime, and in the second book it was Mashitahime, the ancestor of the Juichi prefectures.

Related historical documents 

 Taro Sakamoto and Kunio Hirano, The Ancient Japanese Biographical Dictionary (Yoshikawa Kobunkan).
 "A Genealogical Directory of the Emperor's Family" (Shinninjin Oraisha).

References 

Japanese empresses